William Harrison (26 September 1901 – 1984) was an English professional footballer who played as a goalkeeper in the English Football League for Bury, and also played non-league football for Scotforth, Marsh Wesleyans and Lancaster Town.

References

1901 births
1984 deaths
Sportspeople from Lancaster, Lancashire
English footballers
Association football goalkeepers
Lancaster City F.C. players
Bury F.C. players
English Football League players